Bill "Billy" Shipstad is an American curler.

Shipstad as second for Don Cooper team won the United States men's curling championship in 1983, defeating Bud Somerville in the final.

At the time of the 1983 World Championships, he was a student. As of 2003, he was the general manager of the Icearium in Knoxville, Tennessee.

Teams

References

External links
 

Living people
American male curlers
American curling champions
Sportspeople from Colorado Springs, Colorado 
Year of birth missing (living people)
Place of birth missing (living people)